Maurice Albert Damkroger (born January 8, 1952) is a former American football linebacker. He played college football at Nebraska and was drafted by the New England Patriots in the seventh round of the 1974 NFL Draft. At Nebraska, he played at fullback.

He was also drafted by MLB's Los Angeles Dodgers in 1970 out of high school. His father, Ralph and brother, Steve also played football at Nebraska; Ralph was an End for the Cornhuskers during the 1940s, and Steve played linebacker at UNL from 1979-82.

References

1952 births
Living people
American football linebackers
Nebraska Cornhuskers football players
New England Patriots players
Sportspeople from Lincoln, Nebraska
People from Cambridge, Nebraska
Players of American football from Nebraska
Lincoln Northeast High School alumni